The men's hammer throw event at the 1954 British Empire and Commonwealth Games was held on 7 July at the Empire Stadium in Vancouver, Canada.

Medalists

Results

Qualification

Final

References

Athletics at the 1954 British Empire and Commonwealth Games
1954